Marcos Antonio Aparecido Cipriano or simply Marcão (born April 14, 1973) is a Brazilian former professional footballer who played as a forward. He played in the UEFA Champions League with FC Spartak Moscow.

References

Living people
1973 births
Association football forwards
Brazilian footballers
Torino F.C. players
Mogi Mirim Esporte Clube players
Mirassol Futebol Clube players
FC Spartak Moscow players
FC St. Pauli players
Esporte Clube Vitória players
Guarani FC players
Yverdon-Sport FC players
Associação Portuguesa Londrinense players
Serie A players
Russian Premier League players
Swiss Super League players
Bundesliga players
2. Bundesliga players
Brazilian expatriate footballers
Brazilian expatriate sportspeople in Italy
Expatriate footballers in Italy
Brazilian expatriate sportspeople in Germany
Expatriate footballers in Germany
Brazilian expatriate sportspeople in Russia
Expatriate footballers in Russia
Brazilian expatriate sportspeople in Switzerland
Expatriate footballers in Switzerland